Zaveh may refer to:
 Zaveh, Zaveh
 Zaveh County
 Zaveh Rural District
 Zaveh, prior name of Torbat-e Heydarieh